The Bahia gubernatorial election was held on 5 October 2014 to elect the next governor of the state of Bahia.  If no candidate receives more than 50% of the vote, a second-round runoff election will be held on 26 October.  Governor Jaques Wagner is ineligible to run due to term limits (eight years). In a stunning upset, the PT nominee Rui Costa won the election with 54.5% of valid votes against 37.3% of Paulo Souto in the first-round.

Candidates

Opinion Polling

References

Eleições 2014 - Apuração de votos na BA 

2014 Brazilian gubernatorial elections
October 2014 events in South America
2014